Mansfield Place Church is a church in Edinburgh. The Scottish neo-Romanseque building was designed by Sir Robert Rowand Anderson and completed in 1885. It is located on Mansfield Place (now called the Mansfield Traquair Centre) at the foot of Broughton Street.

Murals 

The church's interior was decorated (1893–1901) by Phoebe Anna Traquair. Her work, the best-known, has been called "Edinburgh’s Sistine Chapel", and "a jewelled crown".

References

Churches in Edinburgh
Former churches in Scotland
Category A listed buildings in Edinburgh